Francis Stephen McAvoy ( – August 6, 1926) was an American lawyer and politician from New York City.

Life
He graduated from Columbia Law School. In May 1905, he was appointed by Mayor George B. McClellan as a Police Magistrate, and in July a judge of the Court of Special Sessions. In November 1906, McAvoy ran on the Tammany Hall ticket for the Court of General Sessions but was defeated by Republican Otto A. Rosalsky, who had been endorsed by the Independence League in defiance of the Tammany/Independence L. fusion ticket.

At the same election, Recorder John W. Goff was elected to the New York Supreme Court. The vacancy was to be filled by the Board of Aldermen, but the election was deadlocked because no party had a majority. The Republicans voted for Alderman James Cowden Meyers, the Democrats for McAvoy, and the Municipal Ownership Leaguers for Judge John Palmieri. On the first ballot, on January 7, 1907, Meyers had 34, McAvoy 27 and Palmieri 12 votes. The deadlock continued when, on January 15, suddenly the M.O.L. aldermen voted for Rufus B. Cowing instead of Palmieri. Hours later Alderman Clifford was arrested and accused of having received $6,000 to change the vote of his party friends. After another week of accusations and much noise in the press, McAvoy received the votes of the M.O.L. and was elected on the 24th ballot (McAvoy 42; Meyers 35 votes) on January 22, 1907, as Recorder of New York City to fill the vacancy until the end of the year.

Due to a prolonged illness, McAvoy took his seat on the bench in the Court of General Sessions (of which the Recorder was one of the judges) only on May 6, 1907. In the meanwhile, D.A. William Travers Jerome and Gov. Charles Evans Hughes introduced legislation in the New York State Assembly which abolished the office of Recorder—one of the oldest offices in New York, in existence since 1683—at the end of the year, and called for the election of an additional judge of General Sessions instead.

McAvoy died suddenly on August 6, 1926, dropping dead on the corner of 152nd Street and Broadway in Manhattan while on the way to his law office; he was buried at Saint Raymonds Cemetery New in the Bronx.

First Deputy New York City Police Commissioner Thomas F. McAvoy was his brother.

Further reading
MAYOR APPOINT'S NEW CITY MAGISTRATES in NYT on May 2, 1905
ZELLER AND McAVOY NAMED in NYT on July 29, 1905
JUDICIARY TICKET NAMED BY TAMMANY in NYT on October 11, 1906
HEARST LEAGUE BOLTS TWO TAMMANY JUDGES in NYT on October 15, 1906
TAMMANY JUDGES WIN IN THIS COUNTY in NYT on November
ALDERMEN IN DEADLOCK OVER THE RECORDERSHIP in NYT on January 8, 1907
ALDERMAN CLIFFORD HELD FOR BRIBERY in NYT on January 16, 1907
JUSTICE M'AVOY NAMED FOR THE RECORDERSHIP in NYT on January 23, 1907
JEROME WANTS TWO GRAND JURIES in NYT on April 29, 1907
NEW RECORDER AT WORK in NYT on May 7, 1907
RESUME OF SESSION's WORK in NYT on June 27, 1907
FRANCIS McAVOY obit in NYT on August 7, 1926 (subscription required)
F. S. McAVOY IS BURIED in NYT on August 10, 1926 (subscription required)

External links

1850s births
1926 deaths
New York City Recorders
New York (state) Democrats
Columbia Law School alumni